A pick-up line or chat-up line is a conversation opener with the intent of engaging a person for romance or dating. As overt and sometimes humorous displays of romantic interest, pick-up lines advertise the wit of their speakers to their target listeners.

Pick-up lines range from straightforward conversation openers such as introducing oneself, providing information about oneself, or asking someone about their likes and common interests, to more elaborate attempts including flattery or humour.

Novices are advised to avoid standardised and hackneyed lines (particularly those resembling country songs) and to put their opening in an interrogative form, if possible.

See also

Flirting
Limerence
Seduction community
Romance (love)
Wit

References

Further reading
Ovid, The Art of Love (2 ad)

Interpersonal relationships
Seduction community